The Man-Thing (Dr. Theodore "Ted" Sallis) is a fictional character appearing in American comic books published by Marvel Comics. Created by writers Stan Lee, Roy Thomas, and Gerry Conway and artist Gray Morrow, the character first appeared in Savage Tales #1 (May 1971), and went on to be featured in various titles and in his own series, including Adventure into Fear. Steve Gerber's 39-issue run on the series is considered to be a cult classic.

The Man-Thing is a large, slow-moving, empathic, humanoid swamp monster living in the Florida Everglades near a Seminole reservation and the fictional town of Citrusville in Cypress County (also fictional), Florida. 

The character made its live-action debut in the film Man-Thing (2005), played by Conan Stevens. He later appeared in the Marvel Cinematic Universe television special Werewolf by Night (2022), motion-captured by Carey Jones and with Jeffrey Ford providing additional vocalizations.

Publication history
As described in the text featurette "The Story Behind the Scenes" in Savage Tales #1 (cover-dated May 1971), the black-and-white adventure fantasy magazine in which the character debuted in an 11-page origin story, the Man-Thing was conceived in discussions between Marvel Comics editor Stan Lee and writer Roy Thomas. Together they created five possible origins for the character. Lee provided the name, which had previously been used for unrelated creatures in Marvel's early science-fiction/fantasy anthology Tales of Suspense #7 (January 1960) and #81 (September 1966), as well as the concept of the man losing sentience.

As Thomas recalled in 2002:

Thomas worked out a detailed plot  and gave it to Gerry Conway to script. Thomas and Conway are credited as writers, with Gray Morrow as artist. A second story, written by Len Wein and drawn by Neal Adams, was prepared at that time, but, upon Savage Tales' cancellation after that single issue, "took a year or two to see print", according to Thomas. That occurred in Astonishing Tales #12 (June 1972), in which the seven-page story was integrated in its entirety within the 21-page feature "Ka-Zar", starring Marvel's jungle-lord hero. This black-and-white interlude (with yellow highlighting) segued to the Man-Thing's introduction to color comics as Ka-Zar's antagonist-turned-ally in this and the following issue (both written by Thomas, with the first penciled by John Buscema and the second by Buscema and Rich Buckler).

The Wein-written Man-Thing story appeared in between Wein's first and second version of his DC Comics character the Swamp Thing. Wein was Conway's roommate at the time and as Thomas recalled in 2008,

The Man-Thing received his own 10-page feature, again by Conway (with Morrow inking pencils by Howard Chaykin), in Adventure into Fear #10 (Oct. 1972), sharing that anthology title with reprinted 1950s horror/fantasy stories. Steve Gerber, who would become the Man-Thing's signature writer, succeeded Conway the following issue, with art by Rich Buckler (Mayerik began with issue #13). The feature expanded to 15 pages with #12 (art by Jim Starlin), became 16 pages two issues later and reached the then-standard 19-page length of Marvel superhero comics with issue #15, at which point the series also went from bi-monthly to monthly. In Fear  #11 (Dec. 1972), p. 11, Gerber created the series' narrative tagline, used in captions: "Whatever knows fear burns at the Man-Thing's touch!"

After issue #19 (Dec. 1973), the Man-Thing received a solo title The Man-Thing, which ran 22 issues (Jan. 1974–Oct. 1975). Following Morrow, the main series' primary pencillers were, successively, Val Mayerik, Mike Ploog, John Buscema, and Jim Mooney.

 A sister publication was the larger, quarterly Giant-Size Man-Thing #1-5 (Aug. 1974–Aug. 1975), which featured 1950s horror-fantasy and 1960s science fiction/monster reprints as back-up stories, with a two-part Howard the Duck co-feature added in the final two issues. The unintentional double entendre in this sister series' title has become a recurring joke among comics readers.

In the final issue (#22), writer Gerber appeared as a character in the story, claiming that he had not been inventing the Man-Thing's adventures but simply reporting on them and that he had decided to move on. Gerber continued to write Man-Thing guest appearances in other Marvel titles, as well as the serialized, eight-page Man-Thing feature in the omnibus series Marvel Comics Presents #1-12 (Sept. 1988–Feb. 1989), and a supporting role in The Evolutionary War, coming to the aid of Spider-Man. Gerber also wrote a graphic novel that Kevin Nowlan spent many years illustrating, but he did not live to see it published.

A second Man-Thing series ran 11 issues (Nov. 1979–Jan. 1981). Writer Michael Fleisher and penciller Mooney teamed for the first three issues, with the letters page of #3 noting that Fleisher's work had received a great deal of negative criticism and that he had been taken off the book. He was succeeded by, primarily, writer Chris Claremont and illustrators Don Perlin (breakdowns) and Bob Wiacek (finished pencils). Claremont's stories introduced the Man-Thing and Jennifer Kale to Doctor Strange (whose series he was concurrently writing), after which his material focused on two new supporting characters: John Daltry, Citrusville's new sheriff, and Bobbie Bannister, a formerly wealthy girl who is the only survivor when her parents' yacht is attacked. These characters' stories he resolved by tying them to a resolution for his own War is Hell series.

Black and white Man-Thing stories, and some color covers, also appeared in the Marvel magazine Monsters Unleashed as well.

Simon Jowett provided a Man-Thing story in Marvel Comics Presents #164–168 (Early Oct.–Late Nov. 1994). The story was set soon after Sallis' transformation, yet depicted Sallis using a standard personal computer with up-to-date graphics rather than hard-copy files, an example of the floating timeline effect.

J.M. DeMatteis began writing the character in a backup story in Man-Thing vol. 2 #9 (March 1981), which opened with a fill-in by Dickie McKenzie. DeMatteis would go on to write Man-Thing stories in Marvel Team-Up, The Defenders, Marvel Fanfare, and the miniseries Daydreamers, as well as Man-Thing vol. 3 #1-8 (Dec. 1997–July 1998), illustrated by Liam Sharp. The two would re-team for the Man-Thing feature in Strange Tales vol. 4 #1-2 (Sept.–Oct. 1998). Four issues were written, but #3 and 4 were never published. Their stories were summarized briefly in Peter Parker: Spider-Man Annual '99, also by DeMatteis, with art by Sharp and others.

In the 2000s, the Man-Thing has starred in a handful of stories appearing in one-shots and miniseries, including Marvel Knights Double Shot #2 (July 2002) by Ted McKeever, and Legion of Monsters: Man-Thing #1 (May 2007) by Charlie Huston and Klaus Janson.

In 2008, writer Roberto Aguirre-Sacasa retold Man-Thing's origin in Dead of Night featuring the Man-Thing #1-4 (April–July 2008), from the Marvel MAX imprint. This was followed by an eight-page story in Marvel Comics Presents (vol. 2) #12 (Oct. 2008), by writer Jai Nitz and artist Ben Stenbeck.

The Man-Thing appeared regularly during The Punisher's Franken-Castle story arc and became a regular member of Thunderbolts with issue #144.  The series was retitled Dark Avengers with #175, and the Man-Thing continued to appear as a regular character until issue #183. Steve Gerber's posthumous Man-Thing story "The Screenplay of the Living Dead Man", with art by Kevin Nowlan, originally planned as a 1980s graphic novel before being left uncompleted by the artist, was revived in the 2010s and appeared as a three-issue miniseries cover-titled The Infernal Man-Thing (Early Sept.-Oct. 2012). The story was a sequel to Gerber's "Song-Cry of the Living Dead Man" in Man-Thing #12 (Dec. 1974).

Author R.L. Stine made his comics debut with a five-issue Man-Thing miniseries in 2017.

Fictional character biography
Young biochemist Dr. Theodore "Ted" Sallis, a native of Omaha, Nebraska, is working in the Everglades as part of Dr. Wilma Calvin's Project: Gladiator team, which includes Dr. Barbara Morse and her fiancé Dr. Paul Allen, and an assistant named Jim. A Dr. Wendell is later cited as being on the staff after Dr. Calvin is shot. The group is attempting to recreate the Super-Soldier Serum that had created Captain America. Web of Spider-Man vol. 2 #6 revealed that Sallis at one point treated and worked alongside Dr. Curtis Connors shortly after Connors' arm was amputated, driving the research that would eventually transform Connors into the Lizard.

Though warned that the technological terrorist group Advanced Idea Mechanics (A.I.M.) has been operating in the area, Sallis breaches security by bringing with him his lover, Ellen Brandt (referred to here as "Miss Brandt", but later retconned to be his wife). He destroys his notes to his formula, which he has memorized. Later, he is ambushed by two thugs and learns that Brandt has betrayed him. Fleeing with the only sample of his serum, he injects himself with it in hopes of saving himself. However, he crashes his car into the swamp where scientific and, as Man-Thing #1 later explained, magical forces combine to instantly transform him into a slow-moving plant-matter creature with large, solid red eyes. Unable to speak, and with dim memories, he attacks the ambushers and Brandt, burning and scarring part of her face with an acid that he now secretes in the presence of negative emotions. The Man-Thing then wanders away into the swamp.

Sallis' mind was apparently extinguished, although on rare occasions he could briefly return to consciousness within his monstrous form, as in Doctor Strange vol. 2 #41 (June 1980), The Defenders #98 (Aug. 1981), and Peter Parker: Spider-Man Annual '99,  and even to his human form, as in Adventure into Fear #13 (April 1973), Marvel Two-in-One #1 (Jan. 1974), Marvel Comics Presents #164 (Oct. 1994), and Man-Thing vol. 3 #5 and 7-8 (April 1998, June–July 1998).

Under writer Steve Gerber, the Man-Thing encounters the sorceress Jennifer Kale, with whom he briefly shared a psychic link and who knew his true identity, in a story arc in Fear #11-13 – the final issue of which established that the swamp had mystical properties as the Nexus of Realities. Through an interdimensional portal in Fear #19, he meets Howard the Duck, who becomes stranded in this reality. The Man-Thing became the guardian of the Nexus, and found himself facing demons, ghosts and time-traveling warriors, while continuing to encounter such non-supernatural antagonists as rapacious land developers, fascist vigilantes and common criminals. He formed a bond with young radio DJ Richard Rory and nurse Ruth Hart. Issue #12's "Song-Cry of the Living Dead Man", about an crazed writer named Brian Lazarus, spawned Gerber's posthumously published 2012 sequel, "The Screenplay of the Living Dead Man", in the three-issue miniseries The Infernal Man-Thing.

In Man-Thing vol. 2 #1-11 (Nov. 1979–July 1981), writer Chris Claremont introduced himself as a character in the final issue, as Gerber had in the finale of the first series. Additionally, Claremont temporarily became the Man-Thing after being stabbed to death. His and other characters' deaths were later resolved with the intervention of the War Is Hell series lead, John Kowalski, now an aspect of Marvel Comics' manifestation of Death. In Man-Thing vol. 3 #1-8 (Dec. 1997–July 1998), Ellen Brandt Sallis returns to the Citrusville area and encounters a little boy, Job Burke, who is actually the Sallises' son, who had been put up for adoption. Following this series, the story continued in Strange Tales vol. 4 #1-2, and was projected to continue in the unpublished issues #3-4. Summaries based on DeMatteis' unillustrated scripts appear on the K'Ad-mon and Ellen Brandt pages in Appendix to the Handbook of the Marvel Universe.

During the "Civil War" storyline, two S.H.I.E.L.D. agents unsuccessfully attempt to register the Man-Thing under the Superhuman Registration Act.

The Man-Thing later appears as a member of the Legion of Monsters alongside Morbius, the Living Vampire, the Werewolf by Night, the Manphibian, and N'Kantu, the Living Mummy. He later gains the ability to speak comprehensibly through the use of the "Universal Language". Phil Coulson subsequently recruits the Man-Thing for his incarnation of the Howling Commandos.

As part of the All-New, All-Different Marvel branding, the Man-Thing appears as a member of S.T.A.K.E.'s Howling Commandos.

During the "Empyre" storyline, Man-Thing falls under the control of the Cotati led by Ventri that were operating in the Savage Land. Doctor Voodoo takes control of Man-Thing to free Matthew and Black Knight. As Matthew and Black Knight fight the Cotati, a Doctor Voodoo-controlled Man-Thing fights the Cotati's control and defeats Ventri. As Doctor Voodoo exits Man-Thing to assist Scarlet Witch after Ka-Zar was stabbed by a Cotati using Black Knight's Ebony Blade, Man-Thing continued the fight against the Cotati. When the Cotati were defeated, Man-Thing takes his leave after being thanked by Black Knight. Ventri claims that what they learned from Man-Thing's energy has been sent to Quoi to fuel the Cotati's invasion.

Harriet Brome, an agent of the self-proclaimed eco-warriors the Hordeculture, adopts the name "Harrower" and attempts to use Man-Thing to perform a mass culling of humanity, intending to purge the human race and let another species take over. To this end, she attacks and skins the Man-Thing and uses his corpse to produce seedling spores that will emerge in all major cities across the world and burn their victims. When the Avengers respond, Captain America is briefly absorbed by one of the spores, where he meets the remnants of Ted Sallis, who explains that he never truly cracked the super-soldier serum. He attempts to get Cap to contact Connors for help, but when Connors affirms that he can't help, Spider-Man is able to convince Sallis to take responsibility for his past. After Sallis's essence is able to "grow" a new body for Man-Thing, Man-Thing returns to Sallis's old office, where it is revealed that Sallis made a deal with the demon Belasco to crack the formula. When he performs the ritual again, he summons Magik, the new ruler of Limbo, who offers to release Sallis from his current state. Understanding that his freedom would leave Man-Thing an uncontrolled creature of instinct, Sallis agrees to remain and joins Magik's strike team in attacking Harrower. After banishing Harrower to another dimension and destroying her spore-plants, Magik later summons Belasco so that Sallis can properly punish the demon for his role in Sallis's fate.

Powers and abilities

Though the beast now lacks a normal human intellect and has shed any desire to communicate with human society, it nevertheless often becomes an accidental hero as it stumbles upon various crime and horror scenarios.

In the pages of The Thunderbolts, Dr. Henry Pym has expressed the view that the Man-Thing is sentient, though difficult to communicate with. For example, he once rescued an infant and left the child with a doctor (which would require an understanding of the function of a doctor and the ability to navigate to a specific address). He is shown to understand concepts such as how to ring a doorbell, how to put an arm in a sling, and even how to flip an auto-destruct switch. The change in the Man-Thing's intellect can partly be explained by fact that its brain, sensory organs, and central nervous system are now organized in a completely different fashion than a human's; for instance, the Man-Thing's auditory receptors are in his forehead. Regardless of what level of humanity the creature still possesses, it can discern when a person's motivations are evil, which causes it pain and motivates it to lash out.

The Man-Thing possesses a variety of superhuman powers that are derived from the combined interaction of the scientific formula created by Ted Sallis and the mystical energies of the Nexus of All Realities.

It is able to sense human emotions, and is enraged by fear and automatically secretes a powerful corrosive; anyone feeling fear and clutched by the Man-Thing is prone to be burned (either chemically or mystically), hence the series' tagline: "Whatever knows fear burns at the Man-Thing's touch!" Though fear is understandably most people's response to the creature, both for his monstrous appearance and the physical danger of his touch, typically only villains end up meeting an immolating death at its hands. Many survive being burned, notably Ellen Brandt, Nightcrawler (whom he does not even scar), and Mongu, whose hand he permanently attaches to his axe, either due to intervention or dissipation. Unusual psychic and mystical forces react in what passes as the "brain" cells located throughout his body. These unique forces render the Man-Thing extremely sensitive to emotions. Emotions that are mild and generally considered positive arouse curiosity and the Man-Thing will sometimes observe from a distance. However, emotions that are often viewed as negative, such as violent emotions like anger, hatred, and fear, cause the Man-Thing great discomfort and might provoke him to attack. Once provoked into violent actions, his body secretes highly concentrated acid that can burn human beings to ashes within a matter of seconds. Even individuals that have high levels of superhuman durability have proven unable to withstand this potent acid. While the Man-Thing is devoid of violent emotions, his body produces a type of foamy, soapy mucus that neutralizes the acid.

Although the Man-Thing's superhuman strength, speed, intelligence, durability, and immortality, give the monster his powers it is his spiritual ability that makes him immune to any other disease, it has been established that the creature possesses physical stamina beyond the limitations of any human athlete. Initially, the Man-Thing is only slightly stronger than Captain America, but in later appearances, the Man-Thing possesses sufficient superhuman strength to stand toe-to-toe with much stronger villains. He is able to lift a  automobile when sufficiently motivated.

The Man-Thing's body is practically invulnerable to harm. Because his body is not entirely solid, but composed of the muck and vegetative matter of the swamp, fists, bullets, knives, energy blasts, etc. will either pass entirely through him or will harmlessly be lodged within his body. Even if a vast portion of the Man-Thing's body were to be ripped away or incinerated, he would be able to reorganize himself by drawing the necessary material from the surrounding vegetation. The Devil-Slayer once sliced him nearly in half, and he has survived being incinerated by a Celestial, although his healing from the latter has been the longest and most complex in his lifetime.

Due to the construction of his body, the Man-Thing is able to ooze his body through openings or around barriers that would seem too small for him to pass through. The smaller the opening, the longer it will take for him to reorganize his mass upon reaching the other side. This ability can be defeated mystically.

The Man-Thing was once dependent upon the swamp he inhabits for his continued survival; his body would slowly weaken and eventually lapse into dormancy if not returned to the swamp or would be greatly damaged if exposed to clean water. His exposure to the Citrusville waste treatment plant greatly enhanced his ability to leave the swamp, as he became a self-contained ecosystem, feeding off of his own waste products. He generally leaves the swamp of his own accord only if he senses a mystical disturbance. The Man-Thing has also demonstrated himself susceptible to possession by other entities.

The Man-Thing and a host of alternate counterparts have undergone a couple of changes in form, like having the ability to control and alternate plant matter both from its own person and the surrounding area. The Man-Thing also has trans-reality shifting abilities due in part to his nature as a living extra-dimensional crossroads; he is able to open portals to and from alternate realities, interact with different dimensional counterparts and even alternate the physical appearances of said doppelgangers with those of their prime universe iterations. Through his empathic abilities, the Man-Thing can grow more powerful by feeding on the fear of others, increasing his size and mass to titanic proportions during Fear Itself.

Although the Man-Thing lacks a normal human intellect, in his life as Ted Sallis, he possessed a Ph.D. in biochemistry. Sallis is legally dead, but his identity is known to numerous living people, including Wilma Calvin, Ellen Brandt, Stephen Strange, Owen Reece, Ben Grimm, Thog the Nether-Spawn, Jennifer Kale, and anyone they may have told or written to about it. His identity as the Man-Thing could not be considered secret, but his existence is generally believed to be a hoax, and an obscure one at that. In-universe, knowledge of his existence is rarely tied to the experiments of Sallis, as are speculations as to any human identity he may have had. Despite having appeared in Citrusville many times, many there still believe him to be a rumor.

Other known Man-Things
There were other known Man-Things in the comics besides Ted Sallis:

 In the pages of Savage Wolverine as part of the "Marvel NOW!" branding, a different Man-Thing appeared where it resided on a mysterious island somewhere in the Savage Land. Amadeus Cho confirmed that this Man-Thing is not Ted Sallis as it has been rooted on the island for a long time. The Neanderthals on the island used the blood of this Man-Thing to resurrect Shanna the She-Devil.
 During the Secret Wars storyline, a bunch of Man-Things reside on the Battleworld domain of Weirdworld where they are found in the Forest of the Man-Things. The Man-Things encounter Arkon and Skull the Slayer after they fell into their area. The Man-Things are ruled over by the Swamp Queen of the Man-Things (the Earth-11234 version of Jennifer Kale) who is behind the rebellion against the Witch Queen Morgan le Fay.
 Deadpool's Secret Secret Wars revealed the existence of the She-Man-Thing, a character that fought on the Grandmaster's team in a bonus round of the Contest of Champions.
 Roxxon Energy Corporation had created a spawn of the Man-Thing as Dario Agger has its abilities enhanced with the DNA of Groot. When Weapon H is in the Redwood National Forest, Dario orders Dr. Baines to unleash the spawn. Roxxon's Man-Thing attacks Clayton, who transforms into Weapon H. Eventually, Weapon H sets off the Man-Thing's immolation ability enough to start a forest fire. When in the presence of Sonia Sung and Dr. Ella Sterling, Weapon H used his power clap to defeat Roxxon's Man-Thing enough to put out the forest fire. This same Man-Thing was held in a cage with the Brood-infected human Blake in a Roxxon facility as they are freed by Weapon H. When it was revealed that Roxxon had opened a portal to Weirdworld, the Man-Thing took his leave, as Blake claims that he will find a pond to settle in. When the Skrullduggers emerge from the portal and start attacking the nearby humans, the Man-Thing and Blake assist Weapon H in fighting them until it was discovered that the Skrullduggers are shapeshifters. After the Man-Thing secures the defeated Skrullduggers, he is later sent with Blake to keep more Skrullduggers from emerging from the portal. When Weapon H and Dario later check up on them, it was discovered that they had some help in defeating the Skrullduggers from Korg. When the Man-Thing agreed to help in fighting the Skrullduggers, Blake asked him if he had a human form, which the Man-Thing does not respond to. As Weapon H leads the mission to Weirdworld, they are attacked by a tribe of blue-skinned humanoids called the Inaku, who blame them for breaking the Earth and allowing the Skrullduggers to take their queen. After Weapon H got free and Titania knocked Protector Hara into the protective dome enough to damage it, the Man-Thing helps to fortify it as Korg and Titania are assigned to help the Man-Thing protect the Inaku village. When the Skrullduggers attack, the Man-Thing, Korg, and Titania assist the Inaku in defending their fortified village from the Skrullduggers, until they suddenly go in one direction. The Man-Thing, Korg, and Titania find Weapon H with the Skrullduggers under Morgan le Fay's control, so they attack the Inaku village, as they recognize Morgan le Fay of Earth-15238 as their queen. When Morgan le Fay orders Protector Hara to assist Weapon H and the Skrullduggers in attacking those who were sent by Roxxon, the Man-Thing goes on the defense to protect his allies. As the Minotaur fights Morgan le Fay, the Man-Thing is among those who are evacuated through the portal. After Dario pays them the terms of their contract, Titania takes Blake, Korg, and the Man-Thing out to a burger joint down the street.
 Xarus got a piece of the original Man-Thing to grow his own similar creature that was called the Boy-Thing. The Boy-Thing remained all of his time on Xarus' shoulder as he supplied him with sticks for him to use against the vampires. After Xarus was killed by Blade, the latter took the Boy-Thing as his own.

Comic book character spin-offs
Dr. Barbara "Bobbi" Morse was introduced in the second Man-Thing story by Len Wein/Neal Adams, although because of publication delays, she was introduced in Astonishing Tales #6, with the Wein/Adams story presented as flashback. Morse became the costumed hero Mockingbird in Marvel Team-Up #95 and went on to become a prominent member of Avengers West Coast, eventually sacrificing her life to save her husband, Clint "Hawkeye" Barton, from Mephisto. Until recently, her spirit fought alongside Daimon Hellstrom to eliminate demons from his version of Hell; however, she has appeared alive during the Secret Invasion crossover event. At the end of Secret Invasion, Mockingbird was revealed to be alive and had been one of the early captures of the Skrulls.  Morse has joined the New Avengers and has had adventures alongside Hawkeye.

Jennifer Kale debuted in Adventure into Fear #11, which was the first story Steve Gerber wrote for Marvel after his initial tryout. She went on to appear in two team books, The Legion of Night, created and written by Gerber and partially composed of several other Gerber-created supporting cast members such as Martin Gold and Dr. Katherine Reynolds, and Bronwyn Carlton and Bryan Walsh's Witches in which she teamed with Satana the Devil's Daughter and Topaz under the tutelage of Doctor Strange.

Gerber introduced Howard the Duck in a Man-Thing story in Adventure into Fear #19. Howard, who was displaced from Duckworld, an alternate Earth of anthropomorphic ducks in another dimension, via the swamp's Nexus of Realities, later acquired his own series, which was written by Gerber for the first 27 issues.

The Foolkiller, a vigilante who used a ray-gun to disintegrate not only criminals but anyone that he considered foolish, was introduced in issue #3 of this series, bent on slaying disc jockey Richard Rory, introduced in the previous issue. When Rory was serving time for trumped-up kidnapping charges, he accidentally created another Foolkiller when he revealed too much detail about the previous incarnation and the whereabouts of his gear. This Foolkiller became an occasional villain in other Marvel comics. Both Rory and this second Foolkiller, along with nurse Ruth Hart (who appeared in Man-Thing (vol. 1) #2-7) were supporting characters in Gerber's Omega the Unknown, while David Anthony Kraft made Rory a potential love interest for the She-Hulk. A third version of the character, who was in Internet communication with the second, starred in Gerber's 1990 Foolkiller miniseries. A second series by Greg Hurwitz, featuring a fourth Foolkiller, appeared in 2008.

Other versions

The Adventures of the X-Men
In The Adventures of the X-Men, which is based on the X-Men animated series, Storm and Jean Grey are inadvertently teleported to the Man-Thing's swamp from the Mojoverse. The three battle D'Spayre, who appears as a fake preacher trying to lead people up a suicide tower that is drawing energy out of the Nexus of All Realities. D'Spayre, working for the Dweller-in-Darkness, is burned by the Man-Thing when he fears failure. After their defeat of D'Spayre, Jean makes a psychic link with the Man-Thing (which she had done earlier to learn his origin) and is imparted information that she believes is the most important thing in the world. Jean is forced to become the Phoenix once more, using the information obtained from the Man-Thing, destroys the M'Kraan Crystal, and in doing so, ends the universe. However, one survivor is sent into the universe to come, Galactus, thereby implying that the animation continuity takes place eons before the mainstream Marvel continuity.

Mutant X
The Mutant X comic book series depicts a Marvel Universe in which characters' counterparts are vastly different. In the Mutant X Annual '99 (1999), Doctor Strange, the sorcerer supreme of Earth, reveals himself to be the Man-Thing. He returns in Mutant X Annual '01 (2001), and Mutant X #32 (June 2001).

Earth-91
On Earth-91, everyone in that reality is a Man-Thing. The Multiversal Masters of Evil arrive on Earth-91 where they massacre this reality's Prehistoric Avengers. Unbeknownst to the Multiversal Masters of Evil, Doom Supreme secretly saved a Man-Thing variation of Doctor Doom called Doom-Thing where it swore its allegiance to him alongside the other variations of Doctor Doom.

Earth-691
Amazing Adventures (vol. 2) #38 tells the story of what happened when Killraven stumbled across the Miami Museum of Cultural Development and became caught up in the projected dreams of an astronaut from the "Mars launch in 1999". During the hallucination, Killraven encountered distorted versions of numerous Marvel characters. Rather ambiguously, the awakened astronaut later described the figures as "all the heroes from my youth" but he also often referred to them as "myths". The only Marvel character that is definitely "real" in the projected nightmare is the Man-Thing, who appears as part of an actual memory of an encounter that the astronaut had with the creature in the Florida Everglades.

Earth-11234
The Champions encounter a Man-Thing that lives in Mbali, Tanzania. During their mission to Weirdworld, it is revealed that this Man-Thing is a version of Ted Sallis who came from Earth-11234 and that he was part of the Swamp Queen Alliance led by his world's version of Jennifer Kale.

Marvel Super Hero Squad
The Man-Thing appears in issue #10 of Marvel Super Hero Squad.

Deadpool Kills the Marvel Universe
The Man-Thing appears in the last issue and appears to be standing guard over all creation. It ultimately accepts Deadpool's plan and kills the Taskmaster.

Ultimate Marvel
The Ultimate Man-Thing, in the alternate-universe Ultimate Marvel imprint, is similar to his traditional counterpart in mainstream continuity. In his first appearance, he teamed with Spider-Man in Ultimate Marvel Team Up #10, unwittingly saving the superhero from the Lizard. Additionally, in Ultimate Fantastic Four #7, during a flashback that transformed Reed Richards and his colleagues into the Fantastic Four, the Man-Thing is shown for a moment.

What If
The second story in the alternate-reality anthology comic book What If #26 (April 1981) asked, "What if the Man-Thing had Regained Ted Sallis' Brain?" Written by Steven Grant, with art by penciller Herb Trimpe and inker Bob Wiacek. In the story, an alligator that Dr. Oheimer was working on became the new Man-Thing, while Sallis self-immolated at his own fear while fighting it.

What If (vol. 2) #11 (March 1990) featured the Fantastic Four in four scenarios written and pencilled by Jim Valentino, showing what might have happened if the team-members had all had the same powers as one another. In "What if the Fantastic Four had All Become Monsters Like the Thing?", Sue Storm's appearance was that of the Man-Thing. In this form she had lost all but her very basic intelligence and could no longer speak.

In other media

Television
 The Man-Thing appears in The Super Hero Squad Show episode "This Man-Thing, This Monster! (Six Against Infinity, Part 3)", voiced by Dave Boat. This version hails from an alternate reality populated primarily by monsters. He joins forces with the Werewolf by Night and an alternate reality-displaced Iron Man to rescue the former's girlfriend, Ellen, from Dracula. After Man-Thing uses his powers to repel the vampire, he, Werewolf by Night, and Ellen become inspired by Iron Man to form the Supernatural Hero Squad to defend their town from future monster attacks.
 The Man-Thing appears in the Ultimate Spider-Man two-part episode "Blade and the Howling Commandos". This version is a member of the Howling Commandos.
 The Man-Thing appears in the Hulk and the Agents of S.M.A.S.H. episode "Hulking Commandos". This version is a member of the Howling Commandos.
 The Man-Thing appears in Guardians of The Galaxy.
 Hulu intended to air a special titled The Offenders: Giant Sized Man-Thing, which would have seen Howard the Duck, MODOK, Hit-Monkey, Tigra, and Dazzler join forces to fight the titular character. However, in January 2020, Howard the Duck and Tigra & Dazzlers series were canceled, resulting in The Offenders getting canceled as well.
 The Man-Thing appears in the Marvel Cinematic Universe special Werewolf by Night (2022), motion-captured by Carey Jones and additional vocalizations by Jeffrey Ford. This version is still identified as Ted and is a friend of Jack Russell, who comes to his aid after Ted is captured by the Bloodstone estate.

Film
 The Man-Thing appears in a self-titled film, portrayed by Conan Stevens. This version was a Seminole shaman and chieftain before he was murdered and reborn as the vengeful Man-Thing.
 The Man-Thing appears in Hulk: Where Monsters Dwell, voiced by Jon Olson. This version is a member of the Howling Commandos.

Video games
 The Man-Thing makes a cameo appearance in Jill Valentine's ending in Marvel vs. Capcom 3: Fate of Two Worlds and Ultimate Marvel vs. Capcom 3.
 The Man-Thing appeared as an unlockable playable character in Marvel Avengers Academy.
 The Man-Thing appears as a boss and an unlockable playable character in Lego Marvel Super Heroes 2. This version guards the Nexus of All Realities.
 The Man-Thing appears as an unlockable playable character Marvel Contest of Champions.

Music
"Song For Ted Sallis" – Written and performed by The Mountain Goats, this song tells the story of Ted Sallis transforming into the Man-Thing. It appears as the first track on the Hex of Infinite Binding EP, released September 6, 2018.

Merchandise
 Toy Biz released a Man-Thing action figure in their Marvel Legends line in 2005.
 There are four Man-Thing miniatures, all with the same sculpt, but different levels of powers, in the HeroClix "Mutant Mayhem" set which was released in 2004.
 Two more miniatures, one of the Man-Thing and Howard the Duck together and one of the Man-Thing alone, were released in February 2013 as part of the "Amazing Spider-Man" HeroClix set.
 The 2017 Man-Thing is the Build-A-Figure in the Hasbro Marvel Legends line.

Reception
The Man-Thing was ranked #7 on a listing of Marvel Comics' monster characters in 2015.

Collected editions

References

External links
 
 Man-Thing at Marvel Wiki
 Man-Thing (Savage Land version) at Marvel Wiki
 
 
 
 Man-Thing at Don Markstein's Toonopedia
 Index to Man-Thing comics
 Ho, Oliver. "Swamp Monsters and Stoners: When Mainstream Comics Tuned In, Turned On and Dropped Out", PopMatters.com, August 24, 2010

Characters created by Gerry Conway
Characters created by Roy Thomas
Characters created by Stan Lee
Comics characters introduced in 1971
Fictional biochemists
Fictional characters from Florida
Fictional characters from Nebraska
Fictional characters with plant abilities
Fictional characters with superhuman durability or invulnerability
Fictional empaths
Fictional monsters
Fictional mute characters
Fictional superorganisms
Marvel Comics characters with accelerated healing
Marvel Comics characters with superhuman strength
Marvel Comics male superheroes
Marvel Comics mutates
Marvel Comics plant characters
Marvel Comics scientists
Mythology in Marvel Comics